The Omanaia River is a river of the Northland Region of New Zealand's North Island. It flows northwest from the Waima Forest, first as a stream and then as a silty arm of the Hokianga Harbour. The township of Rawene stands at the point where the river meets the main waters of the harbour.

See also
List of rivers of New Zealand

References

Hokianga
Rivers of the Northland Region
Rivers of New Zealand